The South East constituency (No.217) is a Russian legislative constituency in Saint Petersburg. Initially created in 1993, South Eastern constituency covered southeastern Saint Petersburg but in 1995 it was eliminated and split between Eastern and Southern constituencies. In 2016 South Eastern constituency was restored and took most of former Southern constituency as the latter was pushed to the west.

Members elected

Election results

1993

|-
! colspan=2 style="background-color:#E9E9E9;text-align:left;vertical-align:top;" |Candidate
! style="background-color:#E9E9E9;text-align:left;vertical-align:top;" |Party
! style="background-color:#E9E9E9;text-align:right;" |Votes
! style="background-color:#E9E9E9;text-align:right;" |%
|-
|style="background-color:#0085BE"|
|align=left|Sergey Popov
|align=left|Choice of Russia
|
|17.48%
|-
|style="background-color:"|
|align=left|Yury Kuznetsov
|align=left|Liberal Democratic Party
| -
|11.99%
|-
| colspan="5" style="background-color:#E9E9E9;"|
|- style="font-weight:bold"
| colspan="3" style="text-align:left;" | Total
| 
| 100%
|-
| colspan="5" style="background-color:#E9E9E9;"|
|- style="font-weight:bold"
| colspan="4" |Source:
|
|}

2016

|-
! colspan=2 style="background-color:#E9E9E9;text-align:left;vertical-align:top;" |Candidate
! style="background-color:#E9E9E9;text-align:leftt;vertical-align:top;" |Party
! style="background-color:#E9E9E9;text-align:right;" |Votes
! style="background-color:#E9E9E9;text-align:right;" |%
|-
|style="background-color: " |
|align=left|Mikhail Romanov
|align=left|United Russia
|
|30.31%
|-
|style="background:"| 
|align=left|Oksana Dmitriyeva
|align=left|Party of Growth
|
|23.10%
|-
|style="background-color:"|
|align=left|Sergey Antipov
|align=left|Liberal Democratic Party
|
|10.94%
|-
|style="background-color:"|
|align=left|Svyatoslav Sokol
|align=left|Communist Party
|
|7.31%
|-
|style="background-color:"|
|align=left|Anatoly Aleksashin
|align=left|A Just Russia
|
|5.80%
|-
|style="background:"| 
|align=left|Mikhail Gorny
|align=left|Yabloko
|
|4.79%
|-
|style="background:#00A650"| 
|align=left|Oksana Dmitriyeva
|align=left|Civilian Power
|
|4.58%
|-
|style="background:"| 
|align=left|Olga Perova
|align=left|Communists of Russia
|
|2.45%
|-
|style="background-color:"|
|align=left|Olesya Dmitriyeva
|align=left|The Greens
|
|2.13%
|-
|style="background-color:"|
|align=left|Maryana Yakovleva
|align=left|Rodina
|
|1.66%
|-
|style="background:"| 
|align=left|Sergey Kuzin
|align=left|People's Freedom Party
|
|1.64%
|-
|style="background:"|
|align=left|Anatoly Artyukh
|align=left|Patriots of Russia
|
|0.96%
|-
|style="background:"| 
|align=left|Tatyana Prokhorova
|align=left|Civic Platform
|
|0.90%
|-
| colspan="5" style="background-color:#E9E9E9;"|
|- style="font-weight:bold"
| colspan="3" style="text-align:left;" | Total
| 
| 100%
|-
| colspan="5" style="background-color:#E9E9E9;"|
|- style="font-weight:bold"
| colspan="4" |Source:
|
|}

2021

|-
! colspan=2 style="background-color:#E9E9E9;text-align:left;vertical-align:top;" |Candidate
! style="background-color:#E9E9E9;text-align:left;vertical-align:top;" |Party
! style="background-color:#E9E9E9;text-align:right;" |Votes
! style="background-color:#E9E9E9;text-align:right;" |%
|-
|style="background-color:"|
|align=left|Oksana Dmitriyeva
|align=left|Party of Growth
|
|33.28%
|-
|style="background-color:"|
|align=left|Lyubov Yegorova
|align=left|United Russia
|
|21.38%
|-
|style="background-color:"|
|align=left|Vyacheslav Sokolov
|align=left|Communist Party
|
|7.12%
|-
|style="background-color: "|
|align=left|Igor Averkin
|align=left|Communists of Russia
|
|6.98%
|-
|style="background-color: "|
|align=left|Ruslan Gaysin
|align=left|A Just Russia — For Truth
|
|5.66%
|-
|style="background-color: "|
|align=left|Igor Shumilin
|align=left|New People
|
|4.93%
|-
|style="background-color:"|
|align=left|Andrey Nezabudkin
|align=left|Liberal Democratic Party
|
|4.32%
|-
|style="background-color: "|
|align=left|Aleksey Shcherbakov
|align=left|Party of Pensioners
|
|4.10%
|-
|style="background-color:"|
|align=left|Grigory Mikhnov-Vaytenko
|align=left|Yabloko
|
|2.78%
|-
|style="background-color:"|
|align=left|Yelena Gromova
|align=left|Green Alternative
|
|2.18%
|-
|style="background-color:"|
|align=left|Andrey Petrov
|align=left|Rodina
|
|1.63%
|-
|style="background:"| 
|align=left|Dmitry Rumyantsev
|align=left|Civic Platform
|
|0.97%
|-
| colspan="5" style="background-color:#E9E9E9;"|
|- style="font-weight:bold"
| colspan="3" style="text-align:left;" | Total
| 
| 100%
|-
| colspan="5" style="background-color:#E9E9E9;"|
|- style="font-weight:bold"
| colspan="4" |Source:
|
|}

Notes

References

Russian legislative constituencies
Politics of Saint Petersburg